William T. Summerlin (born 1938) is a dermatologist and medical researcher who engaged in scientific fraud involving his claims of successful skin transplantation without immunosuppression. Scientists were unable to replicate Summerlin's results, which drew scrutiny. A lab assistant noticed that one of the white lab mice that was supposed to have a dark patch of skin successfully grafted onto it had fur that was colored with ink from a felt-tip pen. An investigation of Summerlin's research ultimately led to the termination of his employment at Memorial Sloan-Kettering Cancer Center.

The New York Times called this a "medical Watergate", and the Los Angeles Times wrote it was one of the most "notable example(s) of fraudulent scientific research". The phrase "painting the mice" became synonymous with research fraud.

Career
Summerlin began working at Stanford University in 1967, transferred to the University of Minnesota in 1973 and to Memorial Sloan-Kettering Cancer Center by 1974.

At a 1969 conference of dermatologists, Summerlin announced that eight patients at Stanford University successfully received skin grafts grown from cells in test tubes over six weeks old.

In 1973 from the University of Minnesota, Summerlin announced that he had managed to change cell surfaces by soaking the tissue that needed to be transplanted in a common nutrient liquid allowing the tissue to be grafted to the host without triggering any rejection mechanisms, this would be used for burns and scars. "This means 'one of the most significant - even revolutionary - advances (in transplant research)' may be just beyond the horizon" according to an editor from the Journal of the American Medical Association. This new technique aimed to avoid using anti-rejection drugs which can make patients more susceptible to infections. The hope according to Summerlin is to be able to avoid rejections from transplanted organs like hearts and kidneys, the problem is that the transplanted tissue needs to sit for six weeks in the solution before transplant, at this time a heart or kidney could only survive a couple days outside of the body. But Summerlin and his advisor immunologist Robert A. Good hoped that machines would be soon invented that allowed organs to last the six weeks needed for them to soak. According to Good "the potential is fantastic".

Speaking at an American Cancer Society seminar in Nogales, Arizona in March 1973, Summerlin summarized that currently doctors have to replace skin on a burn victim "bit by bit" in order to avoid tissue rejection. Potentially with Summerlin's discovery, doctors would have "skin stored in sheets" grown from donor cells to be used quickly to repair burns.

Investigation and repercussions 
In 1970, working as a "clinical researcher at Stanford University, Summerlin announced that he had been able to transplant skin from one unrelated person to another, avoiding the normal issues of transplant rejection. Other researchers were unable to duplicate the results. in 1973 he transferred to the University of Minnesota where he announced that he had transplanted the skin from a black man to a white man successfully. Again, scientists were unable to confirm this happening.

In 1974, Summerlin was working under Good at Memorial Sloan-Kettering Cancer Center in New York City, conducting research in transplantation immunology, when Good asked Summerlin to repeat the success Summerlin had had with human skin grafting to replicate using mice. Good asked research fellow, John Ninnemann to replicate Summerlin's experiments but Ninnemann was unsuccessful. Accusations from colleagues surfaced that Summerlin had not been successful with his transplants, but instead was faking the results by using a black pen to color the skin on the mouse. A research assistant looking at the mouse discovered that the darkened patch could be removed with alcohol.

A five-person committee led by C. Chester Stock commissioned a report which was released at the cancer center stating that Summerlin had admitted "to the committee that he had darkened the skin of two white mice with a felt-tip pen to make it appear that the mice had accepted skin grafts from genetically different animals, and that on four occasions he had misrepresented the results of experimental transplants of human corneas into rabbit eyes. The committee concluded that Summerlin's actions represented “irresponsible conduct that is incompatible with discharge of his responsibilities in the scientific community.” A mouse from the research at the University of Minnesota was found to have successful skin grafts, but it was later discovered that the mouse was very closely related to the mouse it had received the skin from, thus making it not out of the norm of what would have been expected.

Memorial Sloan-Kettering President Lewis Thomas said that Summerlin was suffering from a "serious emotional disturbance". "He has not been fully responsible for the actions he has taken nor the representations he has made" according to Thomas.

The committee's report also concluded that Summerlin's advisor, Good, was at fault for not fully vetting Summerlin before hiring him, being slow to take claims of sloppy research seriously, and for being overly supportive of successful claims made by Summerlin without collaborating evidence. Good's response was, "that the affair had made him 'a ‐somewhat wiser and sadder person' who, in the future, would be more skeptical about the purported findings of the many scientists working under him".

According to Newsday science writer, David Zinman, cancer research funding may be to blame, congress doubled the budget from $233 million in 1971 to $589 million in 1974. This caused fierce competition for the money and an "early release of data on promising experiments in the hope of attracting recognition and more money". National Cancer Institute Doctor William Terry says that blaming funding is no excuse for scientific hoaxes, there has always been competition and egos involved.

Aftermath
The Memorial Sloan-Kettering Cancer Center committee recommended that Summerlin be fired from his job, but voted to allow him a year of paid medical leave in order for him to receive medical care and rest first.

The New York Times called this scandal "a medical Watergate that reflected dangerous trends in current efforts to gain scientific acclaim and funds for research.” Good was accused of hyping Summerlin's research accomplishments for financial gain of the cancer center.

A 1987 Los Angeles Times article called the thirteen-year-old case one of the most "notable example(s) of fraudulent scientific research".

The phrase "painting the mice" has become synonymous with research fraud.

See also
 Betrayers of the Truth: Fraud and Deceit in the Halls of Science
 List of scientific misconduct incidents
 Elizabeth Holmes

References

Further reading
Joseph R. Hixson. The Patchwork Mouse. Anchor Press, 1976. 228 pages.

External links
 Associated Press photograph of William Summerlin, New York Times

Living people
1938 births
People involved in scientific misconduct incidents